Julijans Vaivods (18 August 1895 in Vārkava, Latgale, Vitebsk Governorate – 24 May 1990 in Riga, Soviet Union) was the Apostolic Administrator of Riga and of Liepāja from 10 November 1964 to his death, and Cardinal Priest of Santi Quattro Coronati from 1983 to his death. He was the first Latvian cardinal and also the oldest living cardinal at the time of his death at age 94.

Biography
Julijans Vaivods studied at the Saint Petersburg Roman Catholic Theological Academy, Russia. He was ordained priest for the Metropolitan Archdiocese of Mohilev by Bishop Jan Cieplak on 7 April 1918 in St. Petersburg. He was initially sent back to Latgale to serve as a parish priest and school chaplain. He came under the jurisdiction of the newly restored Diocese of Riga on 22 September 1918. He was sent to serve as a parish priest in Courland (Kurzeme) in 1925. He later came under the jurisdiction of the Diocese of Liepāja when it was created in 1937. While serving as the vicar general of that diocese, he was elevated to monsignor on 4 July 1949.

Msgr. Vaivods was imprisoned by the Soviet authorities from 1958 to 1960. In 1962 he became vicar general of the Metropolitan Archdiocese of Riga. In 1964 he received a papal invitation to travel to Rome to attend the third session of the Second Vatican Council.

On 18 November 1964 he was consecrated titular bishop of Macriana Maior by Paolo Cardinal Marella in Rome. Cardinal Marella was assisted by Latvian bishops-in-exile Jāzeps Rancāns and Boļeslavs Sloskāns. Bishop Vaivods returned to Rome in 1965 to participate in the fourth session of the Second Vatican Council. He died in 1990 and was buried at the Basilica of the Assumption in Aglona.

On 28 July 1948, the Special Department of the Soviet State Security Ministry recruited Vaivods as an agent under the codename 'Omega'. He remained an agent of the KGB right through the Soviet period. No information has been made public about what information he might have given the KGB.

References

External links
Julijans Cardinal Vaivods
Cardinals Created by John Paul II (1983)
The Cardinals of the Holy Roman Church

1895 births
1990 deaths
People from Preiļi Municipality
People from Dvinsky Uyezd
Latvian cardinals
Cardinals created by Pope John Paul II
Latvian Roman Catholic bishops